Emlyn Walter Hughes  (28 August 1947 – 9 November 2004) was an English footballer. He started his career at Blackpool in 1964 before moving to Liverpool in 1967. He made 665 appearances for Liverpool and captained the side to three league titles and an FA Cup victory in the 1970s. Added to these domestic honours were two European Cups, including Liverpool's first in 1977; and two UEFA Cup titles. Hughes won the Football Writers' Player of the Year in 1977. Hughes completed a full set of English football domestic honours by winning the League Cup with Wolverhampton Wanderers in 1980. In addition to Wolves, he later played for Rotherham United, Hull City, Mansfield Town and Swansea City. Hughes earned 62 caps for the England national team, which he also captained.

After retiring from football, he worked as a media personality, mainly with the BBC. He was made an OBE in 1980 for his services to sport. Hughes died of a brain tumour, aged 57, in 2004.

Early life
Emlyn Hughes was born in Barrow-in-Furness, the son of Fred Hughes, a Great Britain, Wales, Barrow, and Workington Town rugby league footballer.

Career

Blackpool: 1964–1967
After being refused a trial by local side Barrow, Hughes joined First Division side Blackpool. He made his debut for Blackpool in 1964 playing alongside Jimmy Armfield and Alan Ball, initially as an inside forward, but later at left-half.

Liverpool: 1967–1979

1960s
In February 1967, after 28 appearances for Blackpool, Hughes joined Liverpool for £65,000. Manager Bill Shankly was stopped in his car by the police as he drove Hughes to Liverpool for the first time and said "Don't you know who I've got in this car? The captain of England!" The policeman peered through the window and said that he did not recognise the man, to which Shankly replied: "No, but you will!" Hughes did indeed go on to captain his country. Hughes made his Liverpool debut in a 2–1 league win over Stoke City at Anfield on 4 March 1967. He scored his first goal in a 6–0 defeat of Newcastle United at Anfield on 26 August the same year.

Hughes settled into the midfield at Liverpool during a transitional period for the club, earning the nickname "Crazy Horse" after an illegal rugby tackle on Newcastle United winger Albert Bennett. Liverpool did not win any honours in his first four seasons there, but Hughes was seen as a forerunner of the future which Shankly had in mind. His versatility was noticed too – he filled in at left back and central defence, a trait which was spotted by England coach Alf Ramsey in 1969.

Ramsey gave Hughes his debut on 5 November of that year, playing him at left back in a friendly against the Netherlands at the Olympic Stadium, Amsterdam. England won 1–0. He played in the next game in the same position. Hughes scored his only international goal against Wales, the opening goal of a 3–0 British Home Championship victory at Ninian Park in 1972.

1970
For Hughes, 1970 was an important year in his career. After Liverpool were beaten by Second Division side Watford in the quarter finals of the FA Cup, Shankly made a decision to clear out many of the senior players who had in the previous eight years won two League titles, an FA Cup, and reached a European Cup Winners Cup final, and recruit younger players to replace them. Hughes, not yet 23, survived the cull, together with Ian Callaghan and Tommy Smith, and the new recruits who would help establish Liverpool's dominance in the 1970s began to arrive.

Meanwhile, England were about to fly to Mexico and defend the World Cup won four years earlier. Hughes had six caps by the time Ramsey included him in his provisional squad of 27 which flew to South America for altitude-acclimatising friendly games against Colombia and Ecuador. Hughes featured in neither game but was selected in the final squad of 22. He was the youngest player selected by Ramsey, and the only Liverpool player in the squad.

Along with Nobby Stiles, Hughes was one of only two outfield players who did not feature in any game. England progressed to the quarter finals, where they were defeated by West Germany. Questions were raised about Ramsey's decisions during the game. He controversially withdrew Bobby Charlton and Martin Peters in the second half but retained a clearly exhausted Terry Cooper, who played at left back the entire 120 minutes although Hughes was available to replace him. Hughes would ultimately never play in a World Cup.

1970–1971
In the 1970–71 season, Liverpool reached the FA Cup final, losing 2–1 after extra-time to Arsenal, who completed the then-rare double of League title and FA Cup. Hughes was distraught as he collected his loser's medal, and BBC commentator Kenneth Wolstenholme remarked: "Emlyn Hughes there, really absolutely sick." By this time, Hughes had established a reputation for charging upfield from his defensive midfield position on long runs, and for constantly berating referees.

1972
In 2008, Tommy Smith claimed in his autobiography that on 8 May 1972, Hughes told him that he had been speaking to a number of Arsenal players who were "willing to throw a match for £50 a man." Liverpool subsequently failed to win the vital match at Highbury, which meant that Derby County won the league title. Smith wrote that he was "disgusted" with what Hughes said and never spoke to him off the field again. Smith maintained that the only witness was Ian Callaghan. Smith also stated that he thought Hughes was trying to "set him up" and was not really trying to bribe Arsenal players. Smith said he never told Shankly because it would have "broken his heart".

Hughes appeared again for England in the quarter-final of the 1972 European Championships, again under Ramsey, again facing West Germany, again with the same result; victory for West Germany.

1973–1974
In 1973, Hughes won his first League title with Liverpool and his first European honour with the UEFA Cup, against Borussia Mönchengladbach. After scoring goals in a memorable win over Merseyside rivals Everton at Goodison Park, Hughes was made Liverpool captain after Tommy Smith had a publicised falling-out with Shankly, who nonetheless kept him in the team. Smith and Hughes' off-field relationship, already strained due to the bribery incident 18 months earlier, fractured beyond all repair after this, although it never visibly affected their football.

In October 1973, Ramsey selected Hughes to be left back as England hosted Poland at Wembley. Only an England victory would secure a place at the 1974 World Cup, with any other result seeing Poland qualify. England dominated the match but were denied constantly by Polish goalkeeper Jan Tomaszewski. Then Poland had a breakaway after a misplaced tackle by Norman Hunter in the second half, and only Hughes and goalkeeper Peter Shilton were back to defend. The ball was passed to Jan Domarski who shot from the edge of the area. Hughes lunged into a last-ditch tackle but Domarski's shot evaded his block and slipped under Shilton's body and into the net. England equalised through an Allan Clarke penalty but the match ended 1–1 and England failed to qualify.

At the end of the 1973–74 season, Liverpool reached the FA Cup final and beat Newcastle United 3–0, with Hughes receiving the trophy from The Princess Anne. Later that month Hughes was also appointed England captain, replacing Bobby Moore, by caretaker boss Joe Mercer. Hughes led out England for the first time on 11 May 1974 against Wales in Cardiff, which England won 2–0.

1975
Hughes captained England for all of Mercer's seven games in charge, and initially maintained the role when Don Revie was appointed as Ramsey's permanent successor. However, after the first two qualifiers for the 1976 European Championships, Revie dropped Hughes from the team, giving the captaincy to Hughes' former Blackpool teammate Alan Ball.

With Liverpool under the guidance of Bob Paisley following Shankly's retirement in 1974, Hughes focused on club football. Liverpool won no honours in Paisley's first season in charge but achieved another League championship and UEFA Cup double in 1976.

1977
The 1976–77 season began with a shock recall to England by Don Revie, who played Hughes in the second qualifier for the 1978 World Cup, under national captain and clubmate Kevin Keegan. Hughes was now predominantly a central defender and played in a tactically disastrous team against Italy in Rome, which marked the lowest point of Revie's tenure as England manager. England lost 2–0.

Revie selected Hughes for further games through the early part of 1977, during which time Liverpool sought an unprecedented treble of League Championship, FA Cup and European Cup. They won the title but lost the FA Cup final to bitter rivals Manchester United. Four days later, Hughes captained Liverpool to a 3–1 win over Borussia Mönchengladbach in Rome to win the 1977 European Cup Final, the first time the team won Europe's most prestigious club title. He was voted the Football Writers' Association Footballer of the Year.

1978–1979
Revie gave Hughes the England captaincy back for a Home International match against Scotland when Keegan was unavailable, before selecting him for the squad which would tour South America in the summer. On returning to England, Ron Greenwood took over as England manager, returning the captaincy to Hughes. England could not qualify for the World Cup after a defeat by Italy, but Hughes nonetheless celebrated a 50th cap when England beat the Italians 2–0 in the final qualifier at Wembley at the end of 1977.

In 1978, Hughes was in the Liverpool team which played and lost its first ever League Cup final, to Brian Clough's Nottingham Forest in a replay. The league title went to Forest too, but Liverpool retained the European Cup with a 1–0 win over FC Bruges at Wembley, allowing Hughes to lift the trophy for a second consecutive year. By this time Hughes's place in the side was under threat from talented young Scottish defender Alan Hansen, who had arrived the previous season for £100,000 from Partick Thistle.

The following season Hughes made just 16 appearances in the side, enough to earn his final title medal. Liverpool lost to Manchester United in the FA Cup semi-finals, with Hughes caught out of position for the winning goal. He never played for Liverpool again. He was sold to Wolverhampton Wanderers for £90,000 in August 1979. Hughes left Liverpool after 665 appearances, scoring 49 goals, for the club. His 59 appearances for England while at Liverpool made him the club's most capped player until Welsh striker Ian Rush broke the record more than ten years later.

Wolverhampton Wanderers: 1979–1981
Hughes made his Wolves debut at the Baseball Ground on 22 August 1979 in a 1–0 win over Derby County. He went on to win the League Cup in his first season with Wolves – the only trophy he did not win with Liverpool – lifting it as captain after a 1–0 win over Nottingham Forest at Wembley.

He continued to be selected for England squads even after leaving Liverpool. He featured sporadically in England's successful qualifying campaign for the 1980 European Championships, he captained the team for the final time in the 1–1 1980 Home International game with Northern Ireland draw at Wembley and won his 62nd and final cap against Scotland in the next game as a substitute.

Greenwood included him in the squad for the European Championship finals in Italy as an experienced reserve, but Hughes did not play any matches and England were eliminated in the group stages. Hughes was England's only connection with their previous foray into the finals of a tournament – the 1970 World Cup – but his non-participation in either made him England's most capped player never to feature in a major finals. He also became only the fifth player to represent England in three separate decades, joining Jesse Pennington, Stanley Matthews, Bobby Charlton and Peter Shilton. The 57 caps Hughes earned in the 1970s made him the most capped England player of the decade.

Rotherham United: 1981–1983
Hughes left Wolves in 1981, joining Rotherham United as player-manager. Inheriting a side that had won the Third Division championship under Ian Porterfield, including such players as John Breckin, Tony Towner and Ronnie Moore, Rotherham made a patchy start to the season and were in the relegation zone in January. However, a run of nine wins in a row followed and Rotherham climbed from third last to third place in the league. Promotion was missed by four points, but the finish of 7th place was the Millers' highest since the 1960s.

The following season Rotherham appeared to be holding their ground in the Second Division and were 9th at the start of 1983. However, the side plummeted down the table. On the morning of 20 March Hughes was asked to resign as manager. He refused and was sacked, to be replaced by George Kerr the following day. Rotherham were relegated after winning only one more game during the season.

Later football career
Hughes also played for Hull City, later becoming a director. He joined Mansfield Town briefly in 1983 but did not make any appearances for the club. Later that year he also turned out for Swansea City, with whom he brought his playing career to a close.

Post-football career
In 1979, Hughes became a team captain on the long-running BBC quiz A Question of Sport, opposite the former rugby union footballer Gareth Edwards. He left the programme in 1981, but returned in 1984, this time playing against England's former rugby union captain Bill Beaumont. Hughes became much mimicked for his competitive nature and high-pitched protestations when not being able to recall an answer. He once identified a picture of a heavily muddied jockey as John Reid, only to be told it was Princess Anne. Later in the same series, she appeared on the programme, joining Hughes's team. Hughes caused a minor national debate when he defied protocol and put his arm around her. He called her "ma'am" throughout, except for one occasion, when he referred to her as "mate". Hughes later joined her team for the much criticised It's a Royal Knockout project, the brainchild of her brother Prince Edward.

Hughes's involvement with the BBC also included work as an analyst on radio. Alongside Peter Jones he was present at the Heysel Stadium disaster in 1985, saying "Football has died and the hooligans have won." He also was a member of the punditry panel for BBC Television's coverage of the 1986 FIFA World Cup. Hughes hosted the short-lived BBC game show Box Clever during 1986 and 1987. However, he left A Question of Sport – and the corporation as a whole – in 1987 to go to ITV and captain a team on Sporting Triangles. Through this, he occasionally appeared as a pundit on ITV's football coverage. He was also immortalised in comic strip form as he was signed by Melchester Rovers in the Roy of the Rovers strip; he also wrote a column for the teenage football magazine Match. Alongside Peter Jones again, he was present at the Hillsborough disaster in April 1989. Later, he paid visits to the parents of Andrew Devine, who was left comatose after the tragedy, in hospital and offered them support and assistance.

Final years
In later years, Hughes lived a quiet retirement, occasionally working as an after-dinner or motivational speaker. In 1992, he appeared on an episode of GamesMaster promoting the football video game which carried his name, Emlyn Hughes International Soccer. From March 2002, he became a presenter and pundit on the nightly football phone-in on Real Radio Yorkshire. From 1995 Hughes became chief patron to the Sheffield-based charity FABLE (For a Better Life with Epilepsy).

In 2003, it was announced that he was suffering from a brain tumour, for which he underwent surgery, radiotherapy and chemotherapy. Hughes was married to Barbara and had a son and daughter, both named after him (Emlyn Jr. and Emma Lynn).

His last public appearance was at the 2004 Grand National, seven months before his death; he was interviewed on Grandstand as an owner of Mantles Prince, one of the runners. He died at his home in Dore, Sheffield, at the age of 57. A minute's silence was held the following evening at Anfield before Liverpool's game against Middlesbrough in the League Cup. His funeral service took place at Sheffield Cathedral.

Legacy

Eight days after Hughes' death, England players wore black armbands in a friendly against Spain. England forward Wayne Rooney attracted controversy after throwing his black armband to the floor, following a 42nd minute substitution for Alan Smith. Rooney later apologised.

Hughes was voted at No.10 on the official Liverpool Football Club web site poll "100 Players Who Shook The Kop". A statue of Hughes was unveiled in his birthplace of Barrow-in-Furness in 2008. It is placed in front of a new office building on Abbey Road which was also named Emlyn Hughes House after him. A cancer support charity in Hughes' name is run by the Freemasons of Tapton Masonic Hall in Sheffield, of which Hughes was a member. Hughes is also remembered at Anfield, a statue of him being carried by Bob Paisley was unveiled in 2020.

Awards
In 1980, Hughes was decorated with the OBE for services to football, and later featured on the television tribute show This Is Your Life.

On 24 July 2008, it was announced that Hughes would be inducted into the National Football Museum's Hall of Fame. The National Football Museum in Preston started its Hall of Fame in 2002 with the inductees chosen by a selection panel that included Gordon Banks, Sir Trevor Brooking, Sir Alex Ferguson, Sir Bobby Charlton, Jack Charlton, Mark Lawrenson and Gary Lineker. The awards were presented at the annual ceremony, held at the Millennium Mayfair Hotel in London on 18 September.

Honours
Liverpool
Football League First Division: 1972–73, 1975–76, 1976–77, 1978–79
FA Cup: 1973–74
FA Charity Shield: 1974, 1976, 1977
European Cup: 1976–77, 1977–78
UEFA Cup: 1972–73, 1975–76
UEFA Super Cup: 1977

Wolverhampton Wanderers
League Cup: 1979–80

Individual
FWA Footballer of the Year: 1977
Officer of the Order of the British Empire: 1980

See also
 List of notable brain tumor patients
 Emlyn Hughes International Soccer - 1988 computer game

References

External links
 Player profile at LFChistory.net
 
 BBC obituary
 
 Guardian obituary
 Daily Telegraph obituary
 Memory of Emlyn Hughes
 
 
 Complete England Record
 

1947 births
2004 deaths
English footballers
England international footballers
England under-23 international footballers
English football managers
English Football Hall of Fame inductees
English people of Welsh descent
Blackpool F.C. players
Hull City A.F.C. players
Liverpool F.C. players
Swansea City A.F.C. players
Rotherham United F.C. players
Rotherham United F.C. managers
Wolverhampton Wanderers F.C. players
1970 FIFA World Cup players
UEFA Euro 1980 players
Footballers from Barrow-in-Furness
Officers of the Order of the British Empire
British sports broadcasters
Deaths from brain cancer in England
Mansfield Town F.C. players
English Football League players
English Football League representative players
Association football defenders
Association football midfielders
UEFA Champions League winning players
UEFA Cup winning players
People from Dore
FA Cup Final players
Footballers from Cumbria